Baad is a census town in Mathura district  in the state of Uttar Pradesh, India. It is located on NH2, near Indian Oil corporation and Baad railway station, Mathura refinery Township.

Demographics
As of the 2001 Census of India, Baad had a population of 14,690. Males constitute 53% of the population and females 47%. Baad has an average literacy rate of 76%, higher than the national average of 59.5%. 13% of the population is under 6 years of age.

References

Cities and towns in Mathura district